Clydesdale South is one of the 20 electoral wards of South Lanarkshire Council. Created in 2007, the ward elects three councillors using the single transferable vote electoral system and covers an area with a population of 14,621 people.

The ward was previously a Labour stronghold with the party holding all three seats between 2014 and 2017. However, it has since become split between Labour, the Scottish National Party (SNP) and the Conservatives.

Boundaries
The ward was created following the Fourth Statutory Reviews of Electoral Arrangements ahead of the 2007 Scottish local elections. As a result of the Local Governance (Scotland) Act 2004, local elections in Scotland would use the single transferable vote electoral system from 2007 onwards so Clydesdale South was formed from an amalgamation of several previous first-past-the-post wards. It contained the majority of the former Lesmahagow ward and part of the former Clyde Valley ward as well as all of the former Blackwood and Douglas wards. Unlike the name suggests, Clydesdale South covers a primarily rural area in western Clydesdale in the southwest of South Lanarkshire next to its boundary with East Ayrshire. The largest settlements in the ward are Blackwood/Kirkmuirhill and Lesmahagow and it includes the villages of Coalburn, Douglas and Rigside. Following the Fifth Statutory Reviews of Electoral Arrangements ahead of the 2017 Scottish local elections, the ward's boundaries were not changed.

Councillors

Election results

2022 election

2017 election

2014 by-election

2012 election

2007 election

Notes

References

Wards of South Lanarkshire
Clydesdale
Lesmahagow